Babar Luck is a songwriter and musician based in the UK.  Born in Pakistan in 1970 he moved to London at the age of eight years and was educated in East London

Background
Former bassist of the British skacore band King Prawn, Babar Luck has also recorded with numerous musicians including Suicide Bid & Ocarina, has also performed & recorded material with Sandra Falk, Captain Hotknives & Lu Edmonds and continues to create music with an array of players from all walks of life.

Babar Luck has also performed at many festivals of various 'genres' including Transmusicales Festival in France, Beautiful Days Festival in the UK & Denmark's massive Roskilde Festival.

As well as writing, recording & touring his solo works, Babar Luck is currently writing, recording & touring in a variety of musical formations - returning to his rock’n’roll roots with ‘East End Trinity’ (Babar Luck - Guitar and Vocals, Justin Hetterley - Bass and BVs, Andi Bridges - Drums and BVs), expressing his “Sci-fi” Folk music through ‘The Babar Luck World Citizen Folk Band’, via a new multicultural project featuring Italian MC Boika Esteban ‘Remaking Europe’ & has also just finished new recordings with ‘The Babar Luck Experience’ (Babar Luck - Guitar and Vocals, Fabrizio Zidarich - Bass, Tom Murrow - Drums).

Biography
In 2006, Babar Luck released solo album Care in the community which New Internationalist describe as "extraordinary".

In January 2010 Babar Luck accepted an invitation to perform at the TEDx conference in Istanbul, Turkey with the theme "The Limits of Tolerance".

Discography

Solo or own band
Babar Luck (album, Rebel Music Records, 2005)
Care in the Community (album, Rebel Music Records, 2006)
World Citizen Frankenstaanee (album, self-released, 2007)
Journeys (mini-album, self-released, 2008)
Bout Time: Recorded 1998-2005 (mini-album, self-released, 2010)
The Chronicles of John Brute (digital album, Offcut Records, 2012)
The Babar Luck World Citizen Folk Band (s/t, limited edition, self-released, 2010)

Duets
Captain Hotknives
Hot Knives & Luck: Knocking on Heaven's Door (limited edition, self-released, 2010)

Sandra Falk
LuckFalk (mini-album, self-released, 2004)

Band member
Remaking Europe
Remaking Europe (limited edition, self-released, 2012)

East End Trinity
Got No Fear At All (limited edition, self-released, 2010)
Chukka (limited edition, self-released, 2012)

Suicide Bid
The Rot Stops Here (album, Household Name Records, 2006)
This is the Generation (mini-album, Household Name Records, 2005)

King Prawn
First Offence (album, Words of Warning, 1995)
Fried in London (album, Words of Warning, 1998)
Your Worst Enemy (EP, Spitfire, 1999)
Surrender to the Blender (album, Spitfire, 2000)
Got the Thirst (album, Golf Records, 2003)

Contributions
Random Hand
Inhale/Exhale (album, Bomber Music, 2010) (appeared/co-wrote on final track 'Save Us In This World')

Performance history
Babar Luck's previous live performances at festivals & events include

2005 	  -  Womex - UK
2006       -  Transmusicale Festival - FRANCE
2006	   -  Roskilde Festival - DENMARK
2007	   -  Rebellion Festival - Wintergardens, Blackpool, UK
2008	   -  Rebellion Festival - Wintergardens, Blackpool, UK
2008	   -  Portugal Film Festival - PORTUGAL
2008        -  Premier Massy Festival - FRANCE
2009	   -  Beautiful Days Festival - UK
2009        - St Barnabas Community Fete (Bowstock) - UK
2010        - St Barnabas Community Fete (Bowstock) - UK
2010	   -  TedX Conference Series: “The Limits Of Tolerance” - Istanbul, TURKEY
2011      - Slam Dunk Festival - UK
2014      - Properstock Festival, Milton Keynes - UK
2015.     - MK11 Kiln Farm Club, Milton Keynes, UK
2018 - Wonkfest, UK.

References

External links 
Babar Luck official website
The Babar Luck World Citizen Folk Band
EastEnd tRinity
Remaking Europe

1970 births
Living people
Pakistani emigrants to the United Kingdom
British bass guitarists
Male bass guitarists
British songwriters
21st-century bass guitarists
21st-century British male musicians
British musicians of Pakistani descent
British male songwriters